Clifford J. DuBose, Sr. (July 20, 1937 – October 2, 2013), born in Montevallo, Alabama, and nicknamed "Pop" and "Duby", was a former member of the Negro leagues. He was given a try out with the Brooklyn Dodgers.  He played for Birmingham Black Barons as well as the Memphis Red Sox.  He also played for the Nashville Cubs.  He played third base and left field. In 1995, he received Congressional Recognition for his playing in the Negro leagues by President Clinton.

References

See also
List of Negro league baseball players (A–D)

1937 births
2013 deaths
Birmingham Black Barons players
Memphis Red Sox players
Baseball players from Alabama
People from Montevallo, Alabama
20th-century African-American sportspeople
Baseball outfielders
Baseball infielders
21st-century African-American people